Beyond Bulletproof is the fifth studio album by American rapper Mozzy from Sacramento, California. It was released on May 1, 2020, via Mozzy Records and Empire Distribution. Production was handled by sixteen record producers, including Jay P Bangz, Musik MajorX, Tariq Beats, TNTXD, and Yung Lan. It features guest appearances from Blxst, Celly Ru, E Mozzy, Eric Bellinger, G Herbo, King Von, Lil' Poppa, Polo G, and Shordie Shordie. The album peaked at number 43 on the Billboard 200.

The first single, "Pricetag" featuring Polo G and Lil Poppa, was released along with a music video on April 8.

Critical reception

Beyond Bulletproof was met with generally favorable reviews from critics. At Metacritic, which assigns a weighted average rating out of 100 to reviews from mainstream publications, this release received an average score of 77, based on four reviews.

RapReviews.com critic Ryan Feyre said, "Mozzy's greatest strength as a writer is clear intimacy. Every time he spits a verse, I feel like he's talking to me one-on-one with a cigar in hand and his posse surrounding him. There's wisdom attached to his words because he's been through it all. ... Mozzy still carries demons, but there are indeed shimmers of happiness percolating throughout some of these passages". Kenan Draughorne of HipHopDX said, "He doesn't dazzle with sinewy flows or clever melodies; he spits what's on his mind and trusts it will resonate. It definitely resonates on Beyond Bulletproof, due to his transparent lens and well-suited production. Chalk it up as a victory for Sacramento's lyrical champion". Sheldon Pearce of Pitchfork summed up, "Beyond Bulletproof is the closest Mozzy has come to making his songs accessible". AllMusic's Fred Thomas said, "Lyrical themes orbit around topics he often returns to: crime, struggle, and street vengeance. With Beyond Bulletproof, however, the delivery is shades more relaxed and even introspective, allowing for a clearer view of Mozzy's pain as well as his personality".

Track listing

Charts

References

2020 albums
Mozzy albums
Empire Distribution albums